Charles Brown (30 June 1827 – 6 October 1905) was a British engineer. He was born in Uxbridge on 30 June 1827 and was apprenticed to Maudslay, Sons and Field.

Career
In 1851 he moved to Switzerland to join the Sulzer company. In 1871 he left Sulzer to set up Swiss Locomotive and Machine Works (SLM). While at SLM he invented the Brown valve gear, a radial valve gear for steam engines. He became involved in the development of electric locomotives in the 1880s. In 1885 he became manager of Maschinenfabrik Oerlikon and in 1890 he set up Charles Brown and Company at 91 Rione Amedeo, Naples, Italy.

Family
He married a Swiss woman and they had a son, Charles Eugene Lancelot Brown, who founded Brown, Boveri & Cie.

Death
Charles Brown died on 6 October 1905 in Basel.

References

1827 births
1905 deaths
19th-century British inventors
British steam engine engineers
Engineers from London
English railway mechanical engineers